The California Military Department is an agency defined under the California Military and Veterans code § 50. It includes the California National Guard (Army, Air, CSG) and Youth and Community Programs.

The California Military Department and the California National Guard are sometimes referred to interchangeably.

Adjutant General of California
The Adjutant General (TAG) is the commander of all State of California military forces and is subordinate only to the Governor. TAG is:

 Chief of Staff to the Governor
 A member of the Governor's cabinet
 Vested with the duties and responsibilities of the Division of Military Affairs
 Head of the Military Department, and responsible for its affairs, functions, duties, funds and property.

In the 1850 law establishing the California Militia, the office of Adjutant General was separate from that of Quartermaster General. In 1852, the two offices were consolidated when William H. Richardson resigned and Quartermaster General William Chauncey Kibbe became Adjutant General.

Adjutants General have included:
 Theron R. Perlee, April 12 - October 5, 1850
 William H. Richardson, October 5, 1850 - May 2, 1852
 William Chauncey Kibbe, May 2, 1852 - April 30, 1864
 Robert Robinson, January 1, 1864 - May 1, 1864
 George S. Evans, May 1, 1864 - May 1, 1868
 James M. Allen, May 1, 1868 – Nov. 23, 1870
 Thomas N. Cazneau, Nov. 23, 1870 – December 21, 1871
 Lucius H. Foote, December 21, 1871 – December 13, 1875
 Patrick F. Walsh, December 13, 1875 - January 9, 1880
 Samuel W. Backus, January 9, 1880 - July 1, 1882
 John F. Sheehan, July 1, 1892 - January 11, 1893
 George B. Crosby, January 11, 1883 – November 1, 1887
 Richard H. Orton, November 1, 1887 – January 9, 1891
 Charles Carroll Allen, January 9, 1891 – May 24, 1895
 Andrew W. Bartlett, May 24, 1895 - December 23, 1898
 Robert L. Peeler, December 23, 1898 - June 1, 1899
 William H. Seamans, June 1, 1899 - January 3, 1902 (died in office)
 George Stone, January 13, 1902 - February 15, 1904
 Joseph B. Lauck, February 15, 1904 - January 7, 1911
 Edwin A. Forbes, January 7, 1911 - June 18, 1915 (died in office)
 Charles W. Thomas, Jr., June 19, 1915 - December 15, 1916
 James J. Borree, December 16, 1916 - November 30, 1923
 Richard E. Mittelstaedt, December 1, 1923 - January 5, 1931
 Seth E.P. Howard, January 6, 1931 - June 26, 1935 (died in office)
 Paul Arndt, June 27 - October 17, 1935
 Harry H. Moorehead, October 18, 1935 - January 3, 1939
 Patrick J.H. Farrell, January 4, 1939 - June 10, 1940
 Richard E. Mittelstaedt, June 10, 1940 - March 3, 1941
 Joseph O. Donovan, March 3, 1941 - July 10, 1942
 Junnius Pierce, July 14, 1942 - January 13, 1943
 Ray W. Hays, January 14, 1943 - November 30, 1944
 Victor R. Hansen, December 27, 1944 - April 28, 1946
 Curtis D. O'Sullivan, April 29, 1946 - July 15, 1951
 Earl M. Jones, July 16, 1951 - December 31, 1960
 Roderic L. Hill, January 1, 1961 - January 1, 1967
 Glenn C. Ames, March 22, 1967 - June 5, 1975
 Frank J. Schober, June 6, 1975 - December 31, 1982
 Willard A. Shank, January 3, 1983 - February 13, 1987
 Robert C. Thrasher, February 14, 1987 - October 9, 1992
 Robert W. Barrow, October 10 - December 31, 1992
 Tandy K. Bozeman, January 1, 1993 - April 27, 1999
 Paul D. Monroe, Jr., April 29, 1999 - March 2004
 Thomas W. Eres, March 2004 - June 6, 2005
 John Alexander, June 7 - August 1, 2005
 William H. Wade II, September 1, 2005 - February 1, 2010
 Mary J. Kight, February 2, 2010 - April 15, 2011
 David S. Baldwin, April 16, 2011 – July 31, 2022

Office of the Adjutant General
The Office of the Adjutant General (OTAG) is enumerated in CA Military & Veteran's Code § 161 (recently amended by SB807 on 9/17/12)  and consists of:
The Adjutant General (TAG)
The Deputy Adjutant General (DAG)
Assistant Adjutant General, Army (AAG Army)
Assistant Adjutant General, Air (AAG Air)
Chief of Staff and Director, Joint Staff (CoS/Dir. JS)
and others as prescribed by laws or regulations of the United States

California National Guard
California Army National Guard
California Air National Guard
California State Guard

The department's Sunburst Youth Academy is run by the California National Guard.

California Cadet Corps
The California Cadet Corps (CACC) is a paramilitary youth organization in California open to students in the college, high school, middle school and elementary school grades.

Established through statute in 1911, it has trained more than a million young people. It is one of five budgeted youth programs of the CMD.  The California Military and Veterans Code (MVC Section 517) authorizes CACC units as part of all regular schools, for all children in the state.  The CACC is a statewide, school-based, applied leadership program conducted within a military framework. Its primary goal was originally to prepare young men to be officers in the United States military, after Brigadier General Edwin A. Forbes saw that the Germans already had such programs before World War I. The program's goal has since expanded not only to prepare young men and women for military service, but also for the business world, where communication and leadership skills are essential.

The CaCC’s current objectives are to:
 Develop leadership, citizenship and patriotism
 Promote academic excellence
 Encourage personal health and wellness
 Teach basic military subjects

These expanded goals provide personal growth and leadership opportunities for cadets from middle school through high school levels. Activities include summer encampments, field training (including land navigation), marksmanship, and military drill competitions.

The development and maintenance of the CACC's individual units is a shared responsibility of the local school authorities and the CMD. Commandants must be credentialed by the California Commission on Teacher Credentialing and appointed by the Adjutant General.

In accordance with Sections 509–512 of the California Military and Veterans Code, the CMD is responsible for providing uniforms and equipment, developing curriculum, and conducting state level competitions, activities, and awards programs for the cadets. The CMD provides in-service and pre-service training for adult commandants and volunteers across the state.  The CMD is also responsible for issuing state orders for officers and enlisted personnel and updating Commandant and Cadet Regulations.

The CACC program is offered through the school as a component of its school mission and curriculum.  The CACC military science class can be taken as an elective, or for credit as a substitute for physical education—a decision each school or district makes based on the course of instruction provided, the instructors' credentials, and the alignment of the curriculum with state standards.  California State Content Standards in health, science, physical education, social science, language arts, English language development, and mathematics are embedded in the CACC curriculum's content and activities.

The CACC serves as the “national model” for school-based applied leadership programs, and is designed to:
 Support and enhance academic achievement
 Provide training and applied leadership opportunities
 Foster good citizenship and patriotism
 Provide basic military knowledge
 Promote health, fitness and wellness

The CACC provides a structured learning environment to facilitate academic success, leadership development, physical training and improved self-esteem through attaining achievable goals.  It continues to receive support from the education community and civic leaders throughout California.

Unorganized militia
The unorganized militia of California consists of "all persons liable to service in the militia, but not members of the National Guard, the State Guard, or the Naval Militia." "All persons liable for service" is defined as:
 All able-bodied male citizens and declared citizens between 18 and 45 years old

The California Penal Code prohibits "any two or more persons who assemble as a paramilitary organization for the purpose of practicing with weapons", defining a paramilitary organization as "an organization which is not an agency of the United States government or of the State of California, or which is not a private school meeting the requirements set forth in Section 48222 of the Education Code, but which engages in instruction or training in guerrilla warfare or sabotage, or which, as an organization, engages in rioting or the violent disruption of, or the violent interference with, school activities."

Past California State Militia Units
California State Militia Units 1850-60
California State Militia Units 1861-65

References

External links
 
 Military and Veterans Affairs in the California Code of Regulations

Military in California
Military Department